Hopewell is an unincorporated community in Carroll County, Tennessee, United States. It lies at an elevation of 505 feet (154 m).

References

Unincorporated communities in Carroll County, Tennessee
Unincorporated communities in Tennessee